A pagan is an adherent of paganism.

Pagan may also refer to:

Places
Bagan, a city in Myanmar, also known as Pagan
Bagan Kingdom, 849–1287, Burmese Empire
Battle of Pagan in 1287, Mongol defeat of Pagan Kingdom
Pagan (island), in the Marianas archipelago

People
 Ángel Pagán (born 1981), Puerto Rican baseball player
 Blaise Francois Pagan (1603–1665), French military engineer and fortification theorician
 Dave Pagan (born 1949), Canadian baseball player
 Denis Pagan (born 1947), Australian rules football player and coach
 Emilio Pagán (born 1991), Italian & Puerto Rican baseball pitcher
 Hugues Pagan (born 1947), French detective writer
 Isabel Pagan (c. 1740 – 1821), Scottish poet
 José Pagán (1935–2011), Puerto Rican baseball player
 Maria Pagan (contemporary), official at the Office of the United States Trade Representative
 María Vega Pagán (born 1977), Puerto Rican politician

See also
 Pagan (name), people with the given name (first name) Pagan

Groups
 Pagan's Motorcycle Club, in Prince George's County, Maryland, USA

Entertainment

Music
 Pagan metal, a subgenres of Heavy metal music
 Pagan (album), the 6th album by Celtic metal band Cruachan
 Pagan Lorn, a metal band from Luxembourg, Europe (1994–1998)
 Pagan's Mind, a Norwegian progressive metal band
 Pagan Records, a record label

Films
 P.A.G.A.N. (People Against Goodness And Normalcy), a fictional organization in the 1987 parody film Dragnet

Video games
 Ultima VIII: Pagan, 1994 videogame
 Order of the Vine, a druidic faction in the Thief video game series

See also
 Pagans (disambiguation)
 Heathen (disambiguation)
 Neo-pagan (disambiguation)